Eğirdir Castle is a castle in Turkey

It is in Eğirdir ilçe (district) of Isparta Province.

There is no written account of the construction date of the castle. According to local tradition it may be as old as the Lydian Kingdom (BC 6-7 centuries)  But judging from the masonry it was constructed or reconstructed during the Roman Empire or the Byzantine Empire eras. In the early 14th century Eğirdir was the capital of the Anatolian beylik of Hamidids. According to the inscription of the castle, it was restored by Dündar of Hamidoğlu in 1307. However, during the campaign of Timur in 1402, it was partially ruined. During the Ottoman Empire era the castle was a small military post.

References

History of Isparta Province
Eğirdir District
Castles in Turkey